Antigenes (died 316 BC) served as an officer under Philip II of Macedon and continued his service rising to the rank of general under Alexander the Great. After the death of Alexander in 323 he obtained the satrapy of Susiana. He was one of the commanders of the Argyraspides and, with his troops, took the side of Eumenes. On the defeat of Eumenes in 316, Antigenes fell into the hands of his enemy Antigonus, and was burnt alive in a pit by him. 

The reason for Antigenes particularly cruel execution method was due to his unit, the Silver Shields, and their exceptional performance against Antigonus’ infantry during the Second War of the Diadochi

References
Smith, William (editor); Dictionary of Greek and Roman Biography and Mythology, "Antigenes (1)", Boston, (1867)

Notes

Generals of Philip II of Macedon
Generals of Alexander the Great
Ancient Macedonian generals
Satraps of the Alexandrian Empire
4th-century BC Greek people
316 BC deaths
4th-century BC Macedonians
Year of birth unknown
Greek people with disabilities